Winfield House is an English townhouse in Regent's Park, central London and the official residence of the United States Ambassador to the United Kingdom.

The house was built for American heiress Barbara Woolworth Hutton in 1936 on the former Hertford–St. Dunstan estate that had been damaged by fire.  During the Second World War, the estate was used by the Royal Air Force.  Hutton donated it to the United States after the war, and since 1955 it has been the American ambassador's residence. The house is Grade II listed by Historic England as an "exceptional ambassador's residence and as a notable Neo-Georgian town house containing numerous features of note."

Hertford Villa
The first house on the site was Hertford Villa, the largest of the eight villas originally constructed in Regent's Park, pursuant to the development scheme of John Nash. This house was designed by Decimus Burton in 1825 for Francis Seymour-Conway, 3rd Marquess of Hertford, who used it for orgies. Burton's creation was described as, 'decorated simplicity, such as the hand of taste, aided by the purse of wealth can alone execute'. Burton's design was subsequently refurbished with an updated exterior. Later, this Georgian style villa became known as 'St Dunstan's' because of the distinctive clock that hung in front of it, which was purchased by the art-collecting Marquess of Hertford when it was auctioned from the church of St Dunstan-in-the-West prior to the church's demolition in 1829–30 for a road-widening scheme.

Subsequent occupants who leased Hertford Villa–St. Dunstan's included American financier Otto Kahn and British newspaper proprietor Lord Rothermere. During the First World War, Kahn lent the house to a new charity for blinded servicemen, which took the name of St Dunstan's (now Blind Veterans UK). After a fire in 1936, the house and grounds were purchased by Barbara Hutton and then demolished.

Winfield House
Hutton commissioned a new mansion to be built in the Neo-Georgian style, which was designed by Leonard Rome Guthrie of the English architectural practice Wimperis, Simpson and Guthrie. The house was at first known by one of the names of its predecessor (St Dunstan's), but Lord Fraser of Lonsdale, head of the soldiers' charity, approached Hutton to explain that the similarity in the name and location of her house and his organisation (still with an office in Regent's Park) caused confusion, and he asked that she give up the historical name. She agreed to the request and chose a new name, derived from her grandfather Frank Winfield Woolworth, who had an estate, Winfield Hall, in Glen Cove, New York.

During the Second World War, the house was used by a Royal Air Force barrage balloon unit and as an officers' club. It was visited during the war by film actor Cary Grant, who was married to Hutton at the time. After the war, Hutton sold the house to the American government for a token sum, one dollar.

After extensive renovations, Winfield House became the ambassador's residence in 1955. The previous official residence at 14 Prince's Gate had been deemed inadequately secure. The house is listed on the U.S. Secretary of State's Register of Culturally Significant Property, which denotes properties owned by the U.S. State Department with particular cultural or historical significance. The interiors have undergone several alterations at various points, including in 1969 by William Haines, a decorator and former silent film star.

Grounds
Winfield House is situated within twelve acres of grounds set into Regent's Park, which includes a small front wood, sculpture garden, formal garden, vegetable garden, and tennis court, as well as an extensive lawn which comprises the majority of the acreage.  Pathways and drives extend into the grounds, and connect the front garden and entrance to the rear. The property is surrounded by trees, primarily for security and privacy.

See also

 List of structures in London
 United Kingdom – United States relations
 U.S. Embassy, London
 British Ambassador's residence in Washington, D.C., the British equivalent of Winfield House
 Deerfield Residence (Dublin), residence of the US ambassador to Ireland

References

Bibliography

External links

Official website
Winfield House (Hertford Villa, St Dunstan's) in the DiCamillo Companion

Diplomatic residences in London
Buildings of the United States government
Grade II listed houses in the City of Westminster
Houses completed in 1936
Official residences in the United Kingdom
Buildings and structures in Regent's Park
Register of Culturally Significant Property
United Kingdom–United States relations
Woolworth family